The 2021 Cheez-It Bowl was a college football bowl game played on December 29, 2021, with kickoff at 5:45 p.m. EST and televised on ESPN. It was the 32nd edition of the Cheez-It Bowl, and was one of the 2021–22 bowl games concluding the 2021 FBS football season. Food manufacturing company Kellogg's was the title sponsor of the game, through its Cheez-It brand.

Teams
Consistent with conference tie-ins, the game will be played between teams from the Atlantic Coast Conference (ACC) and the Big 12 Conference.

This will be the first time that Clemson and Iowa State have ever played each other.

Clemson Tigers

Clemson completed their regular season with a 9–3 overall record, 6–2 in ACC games. The Tigers suffered two losses in their first four games, and did not reach the ACC Championship Game for the first time since the 2014 season. Clemson played three ranked teams during the regular season, losing to Georgia and Pittsburgh while defeating Wake Forest.

Iowa State Cyclones

Iowa State completed their regular season with an overall 7–5 record, 5–4 in Big 12 games. The Cyclones also lost two of their first four games, and later finished the season by losing three of their final five games. Iowa State faced three ranked FBS teams during the regular season, losing to Iowa and Oklahoma while defeating Oklahoma State.

Game summary

Statistics

See also
2022 Citrus Bowl, contested at the same venue three days later

References

External links
 Game statistics at statbroadcast.com

Cheez-It Bowl
Cheez-It Bowl
Clemson Tigers football bowl games
Iowa State Cyclones football bowl games
Cheez-It Bowl
Cheez-It Bowl